Morphine is a 2008 Russian film directed by Aleksei Balabanov, using the script by Sergei Bodrov Jr., based on the semi-autobiographical short stories by Mikhail Bulgakov.

Plot
The film takes place in late autumn and early winter of 1917 during the events of the October Revolution and the beginning of the Russian Civil War. A young Russian doctor called Mikhail Polyakov (Leonid Bichevin) arrives at a small hospital in a remote village in Yaroslavl Governorate. Having freshly graduated from medical school, with little experience, he is the only doctor in the rural district. He works hard, earning the respect of his small staff (one paramedic and two nurses).

After an allergic reaction to a diphtheria vaccination, he has his nurse Anna give him morphine to negate the effects. Gradually he slips into addiction.

Soundtrack
Songs performed by Alexander Vertinsky"Tango Magnolia", "Snow Lullaby", "Cocainetka"were used in the soundtrack of the film.

Awards
At the 2009 Russian Guild of Film Critics Awards Aleksei Balabanov received the prize Best Director.

See also
A Young Doctor's Notebook, 2012–13 Sky Arts television adaptation of the same Bulgakov stories
Aleksei Balabanov, director of Morphine

References

External links
 Official film website
 

2008 films
2008 drama films
Russian drama films
Films directed by Aleksei Balabanov
Films about drugs
Films about physicians
Films based on short fiction
Films based on works by Mikhail Bulgakov
Films set in 1917
Films set in Russia
Films shot in Yaroslavl Oblast
Medical-themed films
Russian Revolution films